The Ionian Bank (IB) was a British overseas bank that investors established in 1839 to operate in the Ionian Isles, which was then a British Protectorate. It served also as the central bank of the United States of the Ionian Islands.  IB later expanded in Greece and the Eastern Mediterranean. After losing its branches in Egypt to nationalization, IB retreated from the Mediterranean, selling all its operations there.  Michael Behrens and John Trusted then acquired Ionian Bank, converting it into a merchant bank in London. This London operation was never very successful and in 1977 it voluntarily gave up its banking licence. The Greek operation, renamed Ionian Popular Bank, was absorbed into Alpha Bank in 2000.

History
A "decree of the Eminent Senate of the Commonwealth of Ionian Islands" established the Ionian State Bank in 1839, to finance trade between the Ionian Islands (a British protectorate), and Great Britain. This made the bank the oldest in Greece. The bank received a 20-year grant of the exclusive privilege of issuing and circulating banknotes for the Ionian Islands. The bank soon changed its name to Ionian Bank (IB), and initially only operated in the Ionian Islands, opening branches in Corfu, Zakynthos and Kefalonia the following year. In 1845, a year after the bank received a UK royal charter, it established agencies in Athens and Patras, and appointed special agents in Venice and Trieste.

In 1864, the Ionian Islands united with Greece. A new charter made IB a Société Anonyme, with the Greek government assuming  its debt. That year too IB converted its agencies in Athens and Patras to full branches (possibly before 1864.) IB then extended its operations to the rest of Greece. The Athens office took over as Head Office from the Corfu office in 1873. By 1880 the bank had lost its legal monopoly position in the Islands, but gained an extension to its (no longer exclusive) right of note issue. In 1883, IB gave up its royal charter and registered as a limited liability company.

IB retained its Greek charter until 1905 and expanded into Egypt by opening branches in Alexandria in 1907.

During World War I, Ionian Bank served Allied military interests in the Balkans, opening branches at Salonika, Syra, Chios and Mitylene.

Between the Wars

In 1920, Ionian Bank lost its privilege of note issue. Two years later, IB acquired the Constantinople branch of Guaranty Trust Co. of New York, and possibly a sub-branch or agency in Smyrna. In 1924, IB continued its international expansion by opening  a representative office in New York. Then in 1926, IB established a branch in Nicosia, Cyprus and next year agencies in Famagusta, Limassol and Larnaca.  IB retreated from New York in 1928, closing its branch office there, and from Constantinople the next year by selling its branch there to Deutsche Bank. Lastly, in 1938, it acquired more than two-thirds of the share capital of Popular Bank, which was established in 1905.

World War II and after

During World War II, the Italians forcibly acquired IB's holdings in Popular Bank and ran it as an Italian bank for the duration. At the end of the War, IB regained its holdings. In 1949, IB further increased its holdings in Popular Bank to four-fifths of the capital. Two years later it returned to Egypt by establishing a branch in Cairo.

In 1956, the Egyptian government established Bank Al-Goumhourieh to take over the Egyptian operations of Ionian Bank and the Ottoman Bank in the wake of the Suez Canal War. IB had provided cover for British Intelligence (two directors of the bank, Sir Bickham Sweet-Escott and Robin Brooke, belonged to MI6), but all British and French banks were nationalized by Egypt at the same time.

The next year IB sold its Greek assets to the Commercial Bank of Greece, which maintained IB as a separate entity, and its assets in Cyprus to the Chartered Bank. The Greek IB became the Ionian and Popular Bank of Greece by merging with its subsidiary, Popular Bank. Eventually, Alpha Bank purchased the Ionian and Popular Bank of Greece in 1999, and absorbed it in 2000. Commercial Bank of Greece bought IB's London branch.

See also

 Alpha Bank
 Banknote Museum
 List of banks in Greece

Sources
 Ionian Bank (1953) Ionian Bank Limited: A History. (London).
 Cottrell, P.L. (2002) Founding a multinational enterprise: Ionian Bank, 1833-1849, in P. Kostis, (ed.) The creators and creation of banking enterprises in Europe from the 18th to the 20th centuries.  (Athens: Historical Archives, Alpha Bank).
 Cottrell, P.L. (2007) The Ionian Bank: An Imperial Institution, 1938-1864. (Athens: Historical Archives, Alpha Bank).
 Moncrief-Scott, Ian. 2001. International Trade on the Ionian Isles. Financial History (Winter), 28-31.
 Orbell, J. and A. Turton. 2001. British Banking: a guide to the historical records. (Aldershot: Ashgate).

External links
Catalogue of the Ionian Bank papers at the Archives Division of the London School of Economics.
Archives regarding the establishment of the bank
Court of Directors minute books, 1839 to 1917.
Ionian Bank leaflet (pdf).

Defunct banks of Greece
Defunct banks of the United Kingdom
Banks established in 1839
British overseas banks
Banks disestablished in 2000
United States of the Ionian Islands